No. 152 (Hyderabad) Squadron RAF was an aircraft squadron of the Royal Air Force during both World War I and World War II.

Squadron history

World War I
No 152 Squadron was first formed on 1 October 1918 at RAF Rochford as a Sopwith Camel night fighter unit. On 30 June 1919, the squadron was disbanded.

World War II
The squadron was reformed at RAF Acklington and became operational on 6 November 1939 flying the Gloster Gladiator. The squadron converted to Spitfires and while based at RAF Warmwell in 1940 they participated in the Battle of Britain defending the southern England sector which included Portland Naval Base.

From mid-November 1942 the squadron took part in the invasion of North Africa in Operation Torch. They continued to operate around the Mediterranean, including from bases in Malta and Sicily, during the invasions of Sicily in Operation Husky and mainland Italy in Operation Avalanche.

On 19 December 1943, under the command of Squadron Leader Mervyn Ingram, 152 Squadron moved to Burma and joined the RAF Third Tactical Air Force (TAF). During the Battle of Imphal, the squadron operated from front-line strips and supported the Fourteenth Army during its final conquest of Burma. It was disbanded on 10 March 1946 in Singapore where it had moved after the Japanese surrender.

Post-war
On 8 May 1946, No. 136 Squadron was renumbered No. 152 while in transit to Bombay, and began flying Spitfires in June pending the arrival of its Tempests. By early August it had received these, but spares problems led to its being disbanded on 15 January 1947.

The squadron was reformed at RAF Wattisham on 1 June 1954 as a night fighter unit flying the Meteor NF12 and NF14, until again disbanded at RAF Stradishall on 11 July 1958.

On 1 October 1958, No.152 Squadron was reformed, this time as a transport squadron in the Persian Gulf. It was disbanded on 15 November 1967.

Aircraft operated
 Sopwith Camel F.1
 Gloster Gladiator I & II 
 Spitfire Mk.I
 Spitfire Mk.IIA
 Spitfire Mk.VB
 Spitfire Mk.VC
 Spitfire Mk.IX
 Spitfire Mk.VIII
 Spitfire Mk.XIV
 Hawker Tempest F Mk.2
 Gloster Meteor NF.12
 Gloster Meteor NF.14
 Hunting Pembroke C.1
 Twin Pioneer CC.1

See also
List of Royal Air Force aircraft squadrons

References

External links

 

152 Squadron
Military units and formations established in 1918
1918 establishments in the United Kingdom